Keythe Farley is an American actor.

Keythe is a graduate of UCLA and is an active member of the Actors' Gang and Evidence Room theatre companies. Keythe has written for, produced and/or voice-directed episodes of Rugrats, As Told by Ginger and The Wild Thornberries for Klasky/Csupo Inc. Keythe is also the co-author of Bat Boy: The Musical (with Brian Flemming and Laurence O'Keefe) which is the recipient of the 2001 Outer Critics Circle and Lucille Lortel Awards for Best Off-Broadway Musical.

Filmography

Animated roles
Aaahh!!! Real Monsters - Blib
Duckman: Private Dick/Family Man - Ninja #3
Rugrats - Radio Announcer
The Legend of Korra - Captain, Dai Li Agent
Winx Club: Beyond Believix - King Neptune
Alien Xmas - Santa

Animated film roles
Barbie: Dreamtopia - Strawberry Bear #1
Bilal: A New Breed of Hero - Additional voices

Film roles
And the Band Played On - Lab Technician
California Myth - Rick
Dog Tags - Mark Dessau
Hang Your Dog in the Wind
Nothing So Strange - Keith Charles
Private Obsession - New York Photographer

Shorts
Rockwall - Gus

TV series roles
Beverly Hills, 90210 - Jules
Dead Last - Dick Dudley
Full House - Waiter, Max Dobson
Gabriel's Fire - Adam Bryce
Sisters - Director
Star Trek: Voyager - Vidiian #2
The Boys Are Back - David
The Naked Truth - Waiter

Video game roles
Call of Duty: Black Ops III - Additional voices
Chocobo GP - Leviathan
Dishonored 2 - Guard
Fallout 4 - Kellogg, Y9-15, X9-27
Fallout 76: Steel Dawn - Initiate Vernon Dodge
Generator Rex: Agent of Providence - Surge
God of War II - Door Guy, Soldier
Guild Wars 2 - Beigarth
Guild Wars 2: Heart of Thorns - Beigarth
Judgment - Masamichi Shintani
Lightning Returns: Final Fantasy XIII - Additional voices
Mass Effect 2 - Thane Krios, Fortack, Additional voices
Mass Effect 3 - Thane Krios
Red Dead Redemption 2 - The Local Pedestrian Population
Resistance 3 - Jonathan Rose, Anson, Patrick
Rise of the Tomb Raider - Additional voices
Rugrats in Paris: The Movie - Jean Claude
Skylanders: Giants - Eruptor
Skylanders: Imaginators - Eruptor, Wildfire, Weeruptor
Skylanders: Swap Force - Eruptor
Skylanders: SuperChargers - Eruptor, Wildfire, Weeruptor
Skylanders: Trap Team - Wild Fire, Eruptor, Weeruptor, Sleep Dragon
Starhawk - Rifters
Tactics Ogre: Reborn - Balxephon V. Rahms
Where the Water Tastes Like Wine - Narrator

Crew work
 Adventure Time - Voice director
 Agatha Christie: And Then There Were None - Voice director
 As Told by Ginger - Voice director
 Cyberpunk 2077 - Voice director
 Final Fantasy XV - Voice director
 God Hand - Voice director, voice-over casting
 God of War - Voice director
 God of War II - Voice director
 God of War III - Voice director, voice-over casting
 God of War: Chains of Olympus - Voice director
 Lair - Voice director
 Marvel: Ultimate Alliance 2 - Voice director
 Rugrats - Voice director
 Rugrats in Paris: The Movie - Voice director
 Syphon Filter: Logan's Shadow - Voice director
 Transformers: The Game - Voice director

Trivia
In the movie Last Action Hero, Keythe Farley is listed in the credits of the movie-within-the-movie Jack Slater III as playing "himself".

References

External links
 

Date of birth missing (living people)
Living people
Place of birth missing (living people)
American casting directors
American voice directors
American male video game actors
American male voice actors
American male film actors
American male television actors
20th-century American male actors
21st-century American male actors
Year of birth missing (living people)